Francesco Calzona (born 24 October 1968) is an Italian association football coach, currently managing the Slovakia national football team.

Playing career 
Calzona had a very short career as a player, appearing three times with Arezzo in the Serie B division, and also making a single Coppa Italia appearance.

Coaching career 
Calzona worked as an amateur coach and coffee dealer during the 1990s; during the course of the 1999–2000 season, while in charge of Tuscan amateurs Tegoleto, he opted to resign and instead suggest to hire up-and-coming amateur coach Maurizio Sarri as his replacement. Since then, he became part of Sarri's coaching staff, being his main assistant in all of his managerial jobs until Napoli.

In 2020, he joined Eusebio Di Francesco's coaching staff at Cagliari, then returning to Napoli the following year to work alongside new head coach Luciano Spalletti.

Slovak national team
On 30 August 2022, Calzona was hired as the new head coach of the Slovakia national football team. Following Pavel Hapal, Calzona became the second non-native coach of the team and first of non-Czechoslovak origin.

Sources 

Living people
1968 births
Italian footballers
Italian football managers
Slovakia national football team managers